Albert Ramos Viñolas (born 17 January 1988) is a Spanish professional tennis player. He has a career-high Association of Tennis Professionals (ATP) singles ranking of world No. 17, achieved in May 2017 by reaching the final of the 2017 Monte Carlo Masters.

Tennis career

Junior career
Ramos Viñolas has participated in the finals of six Futures tournaments, four of which he won. He lost in the finals of two ATP Challenger Tour tournaments (in Seville against his compatriot Pere Riba and in Palermo against Romanian player Adrian Ungur). In 2010 he won his first Challenger final in San Sebastián, defeating Benoît Paire.

2010: First tournaments on the ATP World Tour
As World No. 167, Albert Ramos Viñolas began 2010 nearly 300 positions higher than the start of the previous season. He lost in the qualifying rounds of Doha, Sydney and the Australian Open before returning to Challenger tournaments for the next three months. After qualifying into the main draw of the Barcelona Open, and securing a straight sets victory in the first round, Ramos Viñolas defeated World No. 12 Fernando González in three close sets. Despite losing to Ernests Gulbis in the third round, his upset over Gonzalez increased his confidence going forward.

Successive losses in the qualifying rounds of the French Open, and Wimbledon led to a dip in his rankings, however success at the San Sebastian, Seville and various other Challenger tournaments, gave Ramos Viñolas a ranking of World No. 123 to finish off his season.

2011: Cracking the Top 100
Ramos Viñolas played a combination of ATP World Tour events, and Challenger tournaments over the course of 2011. Second round losses at the Chile and Argentina Open to Fabio Fognini, and Tommy Robredo respectively, gave Ramos Viñolas direct entrance into his first ATP tournaments. He tasted his first grand slam success at the French Open after a first round victory over Javier Marti. He lost to eventual quarterfinalist and World No. 5 Robin Söderling in the second round.

After victories in Milan and again at the San Sebastian Challenger, Ramos Viñolas made it to his first ATP Quarterfinal at the Romanian Open, losing to Florian Mayer in straight sets. His performance in Bucharest allowed Ramos Viñolas' ranking to peak below 100 at World No. 87. Following an impressive win over Marin Cilic in the first round of the Shanghai Masters, Ramos Viñolas finished his year at World No. 66.

2012: First ATP final & continued success, top 50
At the 2012 Indian Wells Masters, he won over Richard Gasquet to reach the third round, where he fell to Pablo Andújar. At the 2012 Miami Masters, he defeated world no. 15 player Feliciano López, then lost to Gasquet in the third round. His lone ATP final came in the 2012 Grand Prix Hassan II in Casablanca, which he lost to reigning champion Andújar in an all-Spanish affair.

2013-2015: Mixed results, minor setbacks; Continued struggles; Resurgence to his previous best
At the 2013 Miami Masters, Ramos Viñolas beat world no. 14 Juan Mónaco and former world no. 4 James Blake to reach the fourth round, where he lost to Jürgen Melzer. At the 2013 Barcelona Open, he defeated Jerzy Janowicz and world no. 15 Kei Nishikori, after which Rafael Nadal defeated him in the quarterfinals.

At the 2015 Shanghai Rolex Masters, Ramos Viñolas defeated world No. 2 Roger Federer in three sets to reach the third round, where he fell to Jo-Wilfried Tsonga.

2016: First Grand Slam quarterfinal and first ATP title

At the 2016 French Open, Ramos Viñolas advanced to the quarterfinals by defeating eighth seed Milos Raonic in straight sets in the fourth round. He then lost in straight sets to third seed Stan Wawrinka. Later that year at Wimbledon, he defeated Vasek Pospisil in four sets, and then 25th seed Viktor Troicki, to reach the third round for the first time.

Ramos Viñolas next played at the Swedish Open as the third seed. He defeated Roberto Carballés Baena in straight sets, and then beat Andrea Arnaboldi in three sets. In the semifinals, he defeated top seed David Ferrer in straight sets. He won his first ATP title when he defeated fifth seed Fernando Verdasco in the final in straight sets.

He continued his good form for the year by reaching the final in Chengdu, where he lost to the young Russian Karen Khachanov in three sets.

2017: First Masters 1000 Final and top 20 debut
Ramos Viñolas reached the final of the 2017 Monte-Carlo Rolex Masters, beating top seed Andy Murray, 5th seed Marin Cilic, 11th seed Lucas Pouille in the 4th round, quarterfinal and semifinal respectively en route to the championship match, where he lost to the 9 times tournament champion Rafael Nadal. He reached his career-high of world No. 17 on 8 May 2017, following a quarterfinal run at the 2017 Barcelona Open Banco Sabadell where he was defeated by the top seed Andy Murray.

2018-2019: Major third round, Second ATP title
At the 2018 Australian Open he reached the third round, his best showing at this Grand Slam, where he was defeated by the 14th seed Novak Djokovic.

He won his second title on clay at the 2019 Swiss Open Gstaad in July and reached in the same month his 7th final on clay at the 2019 Generali Open Kitzbühel in Austria, where he lost to top seed Dominic Thiem.

2020-2021: Third ATP title, return to top 40
Ramos Viñolas reached the finals of two ATP tournaments on clay at the 2021 Córdoba Open, where he was defeated by first time qualifier Argentine Juan Manuel Cerundolo ranked No. 335, and at the 2021 Estoril Open, without losing a set reaching his 10th career final and third ATP title on clay defeating Brit Cameron Norrie in three sets. As a result he returned to the top 40 on 3 May 2021, for the first time since March 2020.

2022-2023: Fourth ATP title, ATP & United Cups debut  
Ramos Viñolas participated for the first time in the 2022 ATP Cup as part of the Spanish team where he played doubles with Pedro Martinez (tennis) and lost both doubles matches but Spain still reached the final.

Ramos Viñolas won his fourth career title at the 2022 Córdoba Open where he defeated Chilean Alejandro Tabilo 4-6, 6-3, 6-4, coming back from a break deficit in the second set and a double break deficit in the third set.

He made his debut at the 2023 United Cup replacing the No. 2 player for Spain Pablo Carreno Busta where he lost both of his singles matches.

Playing style
Ramos-Viñolas has a baseline game, comparable to compatriot Rafael Nadal. He is a counterpuncher who uses a heavy topspin game to grind opponents down. He has a heavy topspin forehand, which is his strongest shot to move opponents around the court. He can also flatten out his forehand to produce clean winners. Both wings are capable of producing winners, but his flatter forehand can produce many unforced errors. He has an accurate first serve, which he uses to then set up his next shot. His first serve can break down when under pressure. He is a strong mover around the court, and he makes net approaches often. He also plays with a lot of variety, using slices and drop-shots to mix up his game. He has most success on clay where he won all of his career titles and reached the quarterfinals of 2016 French Open and advanced to his first Masters 1000 final.

Equipment and wear
He currently uses Babolat racquets and wears Joma clothes and footwear after ending his contract with Lacoste this year.

Personal life
His sister Anna played college tennis at the University of the Pacific. He married Helena Martí in November 2017, and they had a daughter born in August 2020.

Performance timelines

Singles 
Current through the 2022 Miami Open.

Doubles

Significant finals

Masters 1000 finals

Singles: 1 (1 runner–up)

ATP career finals

Singles: 11 (4 titles, 7 runner-ups)

Doubles: 1 (1 runner-up)

Challenger and Futures finals

Singles: 19 (11–8)

Doubles: 5 (1–4)

Record against top 10 players

Ramos' match record against those who have been ranked in the top 10, with those who have been No. 1 in bold (ATP World Tour, Grand Slam and Davis Cup main draw matches).

  Cameron Norrie 4–1
  Casper Ruud 4–1
  Fernando Verdasco 4–5
  Juan Mónaco 3–1
  Lucas Pouille 3–1
  Marin Čilić 3–6
  James Blake 2–1
  Richard Gasquet 2–4
  Gaël Monfils 2–5
  David Ferrer 2–6
  Fabio Fognini 2–8
  Nikolay Davydenko 1–0
  Lleyton Hewitt 1–0
  Jack Sock 1–0
  Mikhail Youzhny 1–0
  Roberto Bautista Agut 1–1
  Fernando González 1–1
  Jürgen Melzer 1–1
  Andy Murray 1–1
  Grigor Dimitrov 1–2
  Roger Federer 1–2
  John Isner 1–2
  Milos Raonic 1–2
  Felix Auger-Aliassime 1–2
  Radek Štěpánek 1–2
  Dominic Thiem 1–2
  Pablo Carreño Busta 1–3
  Tommy Robredo 1–3
  Andrey Rublev 1–3
  Nicolás Almagro 1–4
  Karen Khachanov 1–4
  Kei Nishikori 1–5
  Diego Schwartzman 1–5
  Marcos Baghdatis 0–1
  Matteo Berrettini 0–1
  Mardy Fish 0–1
  David Goffin 0–1
  Ernests Gulbis 0–1
  Daniil Medvedev 0–1
  David Nalbandian 0–1
  Robin Söderling 0–1
  Alexander Zverev 0–1
  Tomáš Berdych 0–2
  Juan Martín del Potro 0–3
  Stefanos Tsitsipas 0–3
  Rafael Nadal 0–4
  Novak Djokovic 0–6
  Jo Wilfried Tsonga 0–6
  Stan Wawrinka 0–7

*

Wins over top-10 players
Ramos has an  record against players who were, at the time the match was played, ranked in the top 10.

Notes

References

External links

 
 
 
 
 
 
 
 

1988 births
Living people
Spanish male tennis players
Tennis players from Barcelona
Tennis players at the 2016 Summer Olympics
Olympic tennis players of Spain